The 2012–13 season of Atromitos F.C. was the 90th in the club's history and the second that the club participated in the UEFA Europa League, after 2006–07. It also was the fifth consecutive season that the club competed in the Super League Greece.

Club

(as of 2 June 2013)

Athletic staff

Other information

Squad statistics

Source: Superleague Greece 2012–13 Compilation.

League table

Main season

Play-offs

References

2012-13
Greek football clubs 2012–13 season